Queen of Mystery 2 is a South Korean television series starring Choi Kang-hee and Kwon Sang-woo. It aired on KBS2 from February 28 to April 19, 2018 on Wednesdays and Thursdays at 22:00 (KST) for 16 episodes.

Synopsis 
Housewife-turned-investigator Seol-ok and passionate detective Wan-seung collaborate to solve mysterious cases and cure the hearts of those who were wounded by crimes along the way. Queen of Mystery Season 2 is a drama that digs into the inside details of daily crimes realistically about a murder next door and sexual assault crime that happened in a blind alley last night instead of dealing with a psychopath or notorious serial killer, etc.

Cast

Main 
 Choi Kang-hee as Yoo Seol-ok
 Kwon Sang-woo as Ha Wan-seung

Supporting 
 Park Byung-eun as Woo Sung-ha
 Kim Hyun-sook as Kim Kyung-mi
 Lee Da-hee as Jung Hee-yeon / Seo Hyun-soo
 Kim Tae-woo as Ha Ji-seung
 Park Ji-il as Kang Bo-guk

Jungjindong Station 
 Kim Won-hae as Station Manager Jo In-ho
 Oh Min-suk as Gye Seong-woo, Violent Crimes Division Unit 1 Team Leader
 Hong Ki-joon as Sergeant Yook Seung-hwa
Kim Jong-soo as Station Chief Shin Jang-gu
 Kwon Mina as Officer Shin Nara, Shin Jang-gu's daughter

Mystery Squad 
 Kim Min-sang as Team Leader Hwang Jae-min
 Min Sung-uk as Corporal Gong Han-min
 DinDin as MC J Bang Jae-soon
 Jang Yoo-sang as Kim Mun-gi
 Kim Jong-hyeon as Officer Lee Seon-ho
 Jo Woo-ri as Yoon Mi-joo

Others 
 Hwang Young-hee as Park Kyung-ja
 Lee Ji-hyun as Lee Young-sook
 Jang In-sub as Im Woo-cheol
 Kwon Hyuk-hyun as a police officer.
 Kim Jin-yeop as Lee In-ho

Special appearance 
 Lee Yong-nyeo as one of the Baebangdong women
 Park Joon-geum as Park Kyung-suk, Seol-ok's (former) mother-in-law
 Jung In-gi as Corporal Jang Woo-seob, Baebangdong-2 officer
 Ahn Gil-kang as Bae Kwang-tae, Seodong Station Violent Crimes Division Unit 2 Team Leader
 Jeon Soo-kyeong as Nam Bok-soon
 Lee Seon-hee as Seon-hui (from Season 1)
 Hwang In-seong
 Lee Ji-ae
 Jang Gwang as Ha Jae-ho, Wan-seung's father
 Hong Soo-hyun as Joo Hyun-ah
 Cha Myeong-uk
 Dong Ha as Park Ki-bum

Production 
 First script reading took place December 22, 2017 at KBS Annex Broadcasting Station in Yeouido, South Korea.

Original soundtrack

Part 1

Part 2

Part 3

Part 4

Part 5

Part 6

Part 7

Part 8

Part 9

Part 10

Part 11

Ratings
In the table below,  represent the lowest ratings and  represent the highest ratings.
NR denotes that the drama did not rank in the top 20 daily programs on that date.

Awards and nominations

References

External links
  
 

Korean Broadcasting System television dramas
2018 South Korean television series debuts
South Korean mystery television series
2018 South Korean television series endings
Sequel television series
Television series by AStory